Michael Karlsen (born 3 February 1990) is a Norwegian footballer who plays as a striker for Ranheim IL.

Career statistics

Club

References

1990 births
Living people
Norwegian footballers
Norway youth international footballers
Rosenborg BK players
Ranheim Fotball players
IL Hødd players
Brattvåg IL players
Eliteserien players
Norwegian First Division players
Norwegian Second Division players
Footballers from Trondheim

Association football midfielders